Qendër, also known as Çlirim or Ferma Çlirim (former state owned farm named Çlirim, Liberation, during the Communist era), is a former municipality in the Fier County, southwestern Albania. At the 2015 local government reform it became a subdivision of the municipality Fier. The population at the 2011 census was 4,207.

References

Former municipalities in Fier County
Administrative units of Fier